Thakeri  is a village in Kodagu district in the Indian state of Karnataka.  It is located about 9 km from Somwarpet. The village is famous for its coffee plantation and other agricultural activities.

Geography 
It has an average elevation of 1035 metres (3396 feet).

Plantations 
Primary occupation of the people living here is agriculture and the plantation is Coffee and the village is full of coffee estates.  Apart from that Black pepper, cardamom, banana, ginger is grown in the estates.  Silver Oak trees which are grown for shade in the coffee estates are sold as timber which fetches the planters good revenue. A lot of citrus fruits are grown like orange, lime, sweetlime and many other varieties of this family.

Languages spoken 
Even though most of the people living here are Kannadigas, other languages like Kodava Takk, Tulu, English, Hindi and Tamil are understood by the people.

See also 
 Madikeri
 Mangalore
 Virajpet

References 

Villages in Kodagu district